The Albuia is a left tributary of the river Siret in Romania. It flows into the Siret in Rotunda.

References

Rivers of Romania
Rivers of Iași County
Rivers of Neamț County